Tilletia is a genus of smut fungi in the Tilletiaceae family. Species in this genus are plant pathogens that affect various grasses. Tilletia indica, which causes Karnal bunt of wheat, and Tilletia horrida, responsible for rice kernel smut, are examples of species that affect economically important crops.

The widespread genus contains about 175 species. The genus was circumscribed by Edmond Tulasne and Charles Tulasne in Ann. Sci. Nat. Bot. ser.3, vol.7 on page 112 in 1847.

The genus was named after a agronomist from France, Mathieu Tillet (1714–1791).

Species
As accepted by Species Fungorum;

 Tilletia abscondita 
 Tilletia acroceratis 
 Tilletia aegopogonis 
 Tilletia ahmadiana 
 Tilletia airae-caespitosae 
 Tilletia airina 
 Tilletia alopecuri 
 Tilletia anthoxanthi 
 Tilletia apludae 
 Tilletia aristidae 
 Tilletia arthraxonis 
 Tilletia arundinellae 
 Tilletia asperifolia 
 Tilletia asperifolioides 
 Tilletia australiensis 
 Tilletia avenastri 
 Tilletia baldratii 
 Tilletia bambusae 
 Tilletia banarasae 
 Tilletia bangalorensis 
 Tilletia barclayana 
 Tilletia beckerae 
 Tilletia belgradensis 
 Tilletia biharica 
 Tilletia bolayi 
 Tilletia boliviana 
 Tilletia boliviensis 
 Tilletia bornmuelleri 
 Tilletia boutelouae 
 Tilletia brachiariae 
 Tilletia brachypodii-mexicani 
 Tilletia brachypodii-ramosi 
 Tilletia brefeldii 
 Tilletia bromi 
 Tilletia bromina 
 Tilletia bromi-tectorum 
 Tilletia bungalorense 
 Tilletia cape-yorkensis 
 Tilletia caries 
 Tilletia catapodii 
 Tilletia cathcartae 
 Tilletia cathesteci 
 Tilletia cerebrina 
 Tilletia challinorae 
 Tilletia chiangmaiensis 
 Tilletia chionachnes 
 Tilletia chloridicola 
 Tilletia chrysosplenium 
 Tilletia colombiana 
 Tilletia controversa 
 Tilletia corona 
 Tilletia courtetiana 
 Tilletia cynodontis 
 Tilletia cynosuri 
 Tilletia dacamarae 
 Tilletia dactyloctenii 
 Tilletia decamarae 
 Tilletia deyeuxiae 
 Tilletia digitariicola 
 Tilletia durangensis 
 Tilletia earlei 
 Tilletia echinochloae 
 Tilletia ehrhartae 
 Tilletia eleusines 
 Tilletia elizabethae 
 Tilletia elymandrae 
 Tilletia elymi 
 Tilletia elymicola 
 Tilletia elytrophori 
 Tilletia eragrostidis 
 Tilletia eragrostiellae 
 Tilletia eremopoae 
 Tilletia fahrendorfii 
 Tilletia festiva 
 Tilletia festuca-octoflorana 
 Tilletia filisora 
 Tilletia flectens 
 Tilletia fusca 
 Tilletia geeringii 
 Tilletia gigacellularis 
 Tilletia goloskokovii 
 Tilletia guyotiana 
 Tilletia haynaldiae 
 Tilletia holci 
 Tilletia hordei 
 Tilletia hordeina 
 Tilletia hypsophila 
 Tilletia imbecillis 
 Tilletia indica 
 Tilletia inolens 
 Tilletia intermedia 
 Tilletia iowensis 
 Tilletia isachnes 
 Tilletia isachnicola 
 Tilletia ischaemi 
 Tilletia ixophori 
 Tilletia japonica 
 Tilletia kenyana 
 Tilletia kimberleyensis 
 Tilletia kuznetzoviana 
 Tilletia lachnagrostidis 
 Tilletia laevis 
 Tilletia lageniformis 
 Tilletia laguri 
 Tilletia lepturi 
 Tilletia lineata 
 Tilletia lolioli 
 Tilletia lycuroides 
 Tilletia lyei 
 Tilletia maclaganii 
 Tilletia macrotuberculata 
 Tilletia mactaggartii 
 Tilletia madeirensis 
 Tilletia majuscula 
 Tilletia makutensis 
 Tilletia marjaniae 
 Tilletia mauritiana 
 Tilletia melicae 
 Tilletia menieri 
 Tilletia mexicana 
 Tilletia micrairae 
 Tilletia microtuberculata 
 Tilletia milii-vernalis 
 Tilletia montana 
 Tilletia montemartinii 
 Tilletia muhlenbergiae 
 Tilletia narasimhanii 
 Tilletia narayanaraoana 
 Tilletia narduri 
 Tilletia nigrifaciens 
 Tilletia obscuroreticulata 
 Tilletia oklahomae 
 Tilletia olida 
 Tilletia opaca 
 Tilletia oplismeni-cristati 
 Tilletia pachyderma 
 Tilletia pallida 
 Tilletia palpera 
 Tilletia pancicii 
 Tilletia panici 
 Tilletia panici-humilis 
 Tilletia paradoxa 
 Tilletia paspali 
 Tilletia patagonica 
 Tilletia pennisetina 
 Tilletia perotidis 
 Tilletia phalaridis 
 Tilletia poae 
 Tilletia polypogonis 
 Tilletia poonensis 
 Tilletia prostrata 
 Tilletia pseudochaetochloae 
 Tilletia pseudoraphidis 
 Tilletia puccinelliae 
 Tilletia puneana 
 Tilletia redfieldiae 
 Tilletia robeana 
 Tilletia rostrariae 
 Tilletia rugispora 
 Tilletia sabaudiae 
 Tilletia salzmannii 
 Tilletia savilei 
 Tilletia schenckiana 
 Tilletia scrobiculata 
 Tilletia secalis 
 Tilletia sehimatis 
 Tilletia sehimicola 
 Tilletia separata 
 Tilletia serbica 
 Tilletia sesleriae 
 Tilletia setariae 
 Tilletia setariae-palmiflorae 
 Tilletia setariae-parviflorae 
 Tilletia setariae-pumilae 
 Tilletia setariae-viridis 
 Tilletia setariicola 
 Tilletia shivasii 
 Tilletia sleumeri 
 Tilletia sphaerocarpa 
 Tilletia sphaerococca 
 Tilletia sphenopodis 
 Tilletia spinulosa 
 Tilletia spodiopogonis 
 Tilletia sporoboli 
 Tilletia sterilis 
 Tilletia subfusca 
 Tilletia sumatii 
 Tilletia taiana 
 Tilletia tanzanica 
 Tilletia texana 
 Tilletia thailandica 
 Tilletia themedae-anatherae 
 Tilletia themedicola 
 Tilletia thirumalacharii 
 Tilletia togwateei 
 Tilletia trachypogonis 
 Tilletia transiliensis 
 Tilletia transvaalensis 
 Tilletia tripogonellae 
 Tilletia tripogonis 
 Tilletia triraphidis 
 Tilletia triticina 
 Tilletia tritici-repentis 
 Tilletia tuberculata 
 Tilletia tumefaciens 
 Tilletia vankyi 
 Tilletia velenovskyi 
 Tilletia ventenatae 
 Tilletia verrucosa 
 Tilletia vetiveriae 
 Tilletia viennotii 
 Tilletia vittata 
 Tilletia walkeri 
 Tilletia whiteochloae 
 Tilletia wilcoxiana 
 Tilletia xerochloae 
 Tilletia yakirrae 
 Tilletia youngii 
 Tilletia zonata 
 Tilletia zundelii 
 Tilletiaria anomala 

Former species;
Note: Assume if no family mentioned (at the end), Tilletiaceae

 T. alopecurivora  = Ustilago alopecurivora, Ustilaginaceae family
 T. arctica  = Orphanomyces arcticus, Anthracoideaceae
 T. ayresii  = Conidiosporomyces ayresii
 T. brachypodii  = Neovossia brachypodii
 T. brunkii  = Jamesdicksonia brunkii, Georgefischeriaceae
 T. buchloeana  = Salmacisia buchloeana
 T. bullata  = Microbotryum bistortarum, Microbotryaceae
 T. calamagrostidis  = Ustilago calamagrostidis, Ustilaginaceae
 T. commelinae  = Kalmanago commelinae, Microbotryaceae
 T. corcontica  = Ustilago corcontica, Ustilaginacea
 T. debaryana  = Ustilago striiformis, Ustilaginaceae
 T. decipiens  = Tilletia sphaerococca
 T. echinosperma  = Conidiosporomyces echinospermus
 T. epiphylla  = Puccinia sorghi, Pucciniaceae
 T. euphorbiae  = Melanotaenium euphorbiae, Melanotaeniaceae
 T. externa  = Anthracoidea externa, Anthracoideaceae
 T. fischeri  = Cintractia fischeri, Anthracoideaceae
 T. gigaspora  = Anthracocystis masseeana, Ustilaginaceae
 T. heterospora  = Conidiosporomyces ayresii
 T. hyalospora  = Ingoldiomyces hyalosporus
 T. hyalospora var. cuzcoensis  = Ingoldiomyces hyalosporus
 T. hyparrheniae  = Conidiosporomyces ayresii
 T. irregularis  = Tolyposporella irregularis, Tilletiariaceae
 T. koeleriae  = Anthracoidea koeleriae, Anthracoideaceae
 T. magnusiana  = Sporisorium magnusianum, Ustilaginaceae
 T. milii  = Ustilago milii, Ustilaginaceae
 T. mixta  = Anthracocystis mixta, Ustilaginaceae
 T. moliniae  = Neovossia moliniae
 T. okudairae  = Franzpetrakia okudairae, Ustilaginaceae
 T. oryzae  = Ustilaginoidea virens, Clavicipitaceae
 T. rhei  = Microbotryum rhei, Microbotryaceae
 T. salweyi  = Ustilago striiformis, Ustilaginaceae
 T. serpens  = Ustilago serpens, Ustilaginaceae
 T. sorghi  = Sporisorium sorghi, [[Ustilaginaceae
 T. sorghi-vulgaris  = Sporisorium sorghi, [[Ustilaginaceae
 T. sphagni  = Bryophytomyces sphagni, Ascomycota
 T. striiformis  = Ustilago striiformis, Ustilaginaceae
 T. thlaspeos  = Thecaphora thlaspeos, Glomosporiaceae
 T. tritici  = Ustilago tritici, Ustilaginaceae
 T. verruculosa  = Conidiosporomyces verruculosus

See also 

 Common bunt
 Iraqi biological weapons program

References 

Ustilaginomycotina
Taxa named by Edmond Tulasne